Voroniv, is a selo located in western Ukraine. It is part of the Chervonohrad Raion, Lviv Oblast, and is situated approximately 10 km from the western border with Poland. Voroniv belongs to Belz urban hromada, one of the hromadas of Ukraine. 

Until 18 July 2020, Bobiatyn belonged to Sokal Raion. The raion was abolished in July 2020 as part of the administrative reform of Ukraine, which reduced the number of raions of Lviv Oblast to seven. The area of Sokal Raion was merged into Chervonohrad Raion.

References

Villages in Chervonohrad Raion